"Help Is On the Way (Maybe Midnight)" is a song by American Christian hip hop musician TobyMac. The song was released as a single on February 19, 2021. TobyMac collaborated with Micah Kuiper in songwriting and production of the single.

"Help Is On the Way (Maybe Midnight)" peaked at No. 24 on Billboard's Bubbling Under Hot 100 chart, and at No. 3 on the US Hot Christian Songs chart. The music video of the song won the GMA Dove Award for Short Form Video of the Year at the 2021 GMA Dove Awards.

Background
TobyMac released "Help Is On the Way (Maybe Midnight)" with its accompanying music video on February 19, 2021. TobyMac shared the story behind the song, saying:

Composition

Reception

Critical response
Jonathan Andre of 365 Days of Inspiring Media gave a positive review of the song, concluding: "A song that has reminded me of help being on the way during the moments where we so desperately need it, well done Toby for this track, a meaningful one, and one that can remind us of the very hope we have in Christ, that help comes for the weary and downtrodden, and the seemingly all-together, alike."

Accolades

Commercial performance
"Help Is on the Way (Maybe Midnight)" debuted at No. 11 on the US Hot Christian Songs chart dated March 6, 2021, concurrently charting at No. 1 on the Christian Digital Song Sales chart. It went on to peak at number 3 on the chart, and spent a total of twenty-six consecutive weeks on the Hot Christian Songs Chart.

The song debuted on the Christian Airplay chart dated February 27, 2021, at No. 35. "Help Is on the Way (Maybe Midnight)" reached number one on the Christian Airplay chart dated June 13, 2021, becoming TobyMac's tenth chart-topping entry.

Music videos
The official music video of "Help Is on the Way (Maybe Midnight)" was published on TobyMac's YouTube channel on February 19, 2021. The music video was directed by Eric Welch, and it features TobyMac's son, Judah McKeehan, as a special guest.

TobyMac released the official live performance video of "Help Is on the Way (Maybe Midnight)" recorded during the Drive-In Theater Tour stops in Mt. Sterling, Kentucky, Dayton, Ohio, and Summersville, Kentucky locations, on June 11, 2021.

Personnel
Adapted from AllMusic.
 Chris Gehringer — mastering engineer
 Serban Ghenea — mixing
 Micah Kuiper — producer
 TobyMac — primary artist, producer

Charts

Weekly charts

Year-end charts

Release history

References

External links
 

2021 singles
2021 songs
TobyMac songs
Songs written by TobyMac
ForeFront Records singles